Compare.com (formerly Comparenow.com) is a comparison shopping website for intangible products, most notably car insurance, with headquarters in Richmond, VA. Compare.com is a sister company of Confused.com,  the United Kingdom's first car insurance comparison site, which is also owned by Admiral Group, plc. Insurance carriers on the compare.com panel are contractually obligated to honor the rate presented on compare.com's site, as long as the user's information is correctly entered. Compare.com typically charges the auto insurer on a cost-per-sale basis.

History
Compare.com was launched in 2013 by Andrew Rose, with the majority of its financial backing from Admiral Group. Other investors include Mapfre, which owns 5.6% and White Mountains Insurance Group, the former owners of Esurance, which owns 18.4%. Diane Engelhardt, wife of former Admiral Group CEO Henry Englelhardt, owns 17% as a result of a fresh round of investment in November 2018. 
The company is currently led by Allie Feakins.

When compare.com began delivering quotes to customers, they did so with partnerships with five carriers. As of March 4, 2016, compare.com works with over 60 carriers to deliver more insurance comparisons to customers.

As of November 2018 Compare.com had received $185 million in total investment, making it one of the most well funded companies in the Insurtech category.

Relationship with Google 

In January 2015, the New York Times revealed that Compare.com had formed a partnership with Google, offering them access to Compare.com's panel of carriers in exchange for a share of the royalties paid by the carrier. They join Coverhound and Bolt Solutions in partnering with Google's platform.

Compare.com worked with Google Compare for the duration of their existence in the American car insurance comparison market, until Google Compare announced that they will be withdrawing their service from the market.

Operations
Compare.com operates under primary ownership of Admiral Group, Plc, which operates 14 brands in seven countries. Other companies owned by Admiral include:

 Confused.com (comparison website in the United Kingdom)
 Admiral Insurance (insurance company in the United Kingdom) 
 Diamond Insurance (insurance company for female drivers in the United Kingdom)
 Elephant Insurance (insurance company in the United States) 
 Balumba (insurance company in Spain) 
 Qualitas Auto (insurance company in Spain) 
 Rastreator (comparison website in Spain) 
 Assicurazioni ConTe (insurance company in Italy) 
 L’olivier assurance auto (insurance company in France) 
 LeLynx (comparison website in France)

National Advertising Campaign
In February 2016, compare.com began advertising their service nationally. The advertising campaign features Agent Compare, who works in an underground facility to bring high-tech solutions to the auto insurance industry. Agent Compare promises to "Save Humanity from high insurance rates, one human at a time."

References

Financial services companies established in 2013
Comparison shopping websites
Companies based in Richmond, Virginia
Internet properties established in 2013
2013 establishments in Virginia